West Sabine High School is a public high school located in Pineland, Texas (USA) and classified as a 2A school by the UIL. It is part of the West Sabine Independent School District located in western Sabine County. West Sabine High School was formed in 1961 by the consolidation of Bronson and Pineland High Schools. In 2015, the school was rated "Met Standard" by the Texas Education Agency.

Athletics

The West Sabine Tigers compete in these sports - 

Baseball
Basketball
Cross Country
Football
Golf
Softball
Track and Field

State Titles
Boys Basketball - 
1963(1A), 1965(1A)

State Finalists
Baseball - 
1982(1A), 1994(1A)
Boys Basketball - 
1968(1A)

References

External links
West Sabine Independent School District

Schools in Sabine County, Texas
Public high schools in Texas
Public middle schools in Texas
1961 establishments in Texas